Awards and decorations of the Illinois National Guard are provided to honor the service and dedication of the men and women who serve in the Illinois Army National Guard and the Illinois Air National Guard.

The current order of precedence for Illinois National Guard awards is found in NGIL 600-8-22 (3 Sept 2010). The following list represents the appropriate order of precedence for Illinois awards. This applies to service members of both the Army and Air National Guard.
 
1. Illinois Military Medal for Valor
2. Illinois Military Distinguished Service Medal
3. Illinois Military Medal for Merit
4. Illinois Cross Medal (pending)
5. Abraham Lincoln Medal of Freedom
6. Illinois Long and Honorable Military Service Medal
7. Illinois Recruiting Ribbon
8. Illinois Military Attendance Ribbon
9. Illinois State Active Duty Ribbon
10. Illinois Outstanding Service Award
11. Illinois Distinguished Service Award

Illinois Military Long and Honorable Service Medal 
The Illinois Military Long and Honorable Service Medal is awarded by the State of Illinois to the Army and Air National Guard members assigned to the Illinois Military Department for 5 consecutive years of honorable service.  Subsequent awards are denoted by bronze Oak Leaf Clusters.

Illinois Military Attendance Ribbon 
The Illinois Military Attendance Ribbon is awarded by the State of Illinois to the Army and Air National Guard members assigned to the Illinois Military Department for 2 years of attendance for Drill, Annual Training and other duties as determined by the Adjutant General. Member must have attended at least 75% of scheduled UTA training as well as Annual Training for the timeframe awarded.

The ribbon denotes the first award and numerals starting with the numeral 2 denote the number of additional awards.

The Illinois Military Attendance Ribbon is white (1/16”), red (1/16”), white (1/16”), red (1/16”), white (1/16”), red (1/16”), white (5/8”), red (1/16”), white (1/16”), red (1/16”), and white (1/16”).

Illinois State Active Duty Service Ribbon 
The Illinois State Active Duty Service Ribbon is awarded by the State of Illinois to the Army and Air National Guard members assigned to the Illinois Military Department for state activation and mobilization.

The Illinois State Active Duty Ribbon was authorized by executive order of the Governor of Illinois on 2 July 1923, General Order 17. It is awarded for service in a State Active Duty status, other than for training, trauma, or ceremony support.  Service in any declared state emergency will only be credited once even though the service member may have been on duty multiple times during the same declared emergency.  Under certain circumstances, this ribbon may be awarded to members performing service under Title 32 USC 502(f)(2)(a), Full-time National Guard Duty, subject to Adjutant General approval.

A State Active Duty Service Roll is established at the State headquarters level and contains the names of all personnel who participated in the service under the executive order of the Governor, Commander-in-Chief of State Active Duty operations within the state of Illinois. The Adjutant General is the final approval authority for the award of the Illinois State Active Duty Ribbon.

An Arabic numeral will be issued for the second and succeeding awards. The ribbon denotes the first award and numerals starting with the numeral 2 denote the number of additional awards.

The Illinois State Active Duty Ribbon consists of a ribbon bar that is blue (1/4”), bronze (7/8”), and blue (1/4”).

Military in Illinois
Illinois